Princess Isabelle of Orléans-Braganza (Isabelle Marie Amélie Louise Victoire Thérèse Jeanne; 13 August 1911 – 5 July 2003) was a French-Brazilian memoirist and consort of the Orléanist pretender, Henri, Count of Paris.

Early life

Born on 13 August 1911, Princess Isabelle Marie Amélie Louise Victoire Thérèse Jeanne of Orléans-Braganza was the eldest daughter of Dom Pedro de Alcântara, Prince of Grão-Pará, erstwhile heir to the throne of the Empire of Brazil, and his wife, Countess Elisabeth Dobrzensky of Dobrzenicz. Her father was the eldest son of Isabel, Princess Imperial of Brazil, the elder daughter and heiress of Emperor Pedro II of Brazil, and Prince Gaston of Orléans, Count of Eu, grandson of Louis Philippe I, the "citizen king" of the French. Isabelle was born in a pavilion on the grounds of the Château d'Eu, her paternal grandfather's home in the town of Eu in the Seine-Maritime department of France in Normandy. She was named after her paternal grandmother, the Princess Imperial.

In 1891, Dom Pedro de Alcântara became Prince Imperial of Brazil to royalists when his mother became claimant to the throne upon the death of the emperor in exile. In 1908, he renounced his succession rights, and those of his descendants, to marry Bohemian noblewoman Countess Elisabeth Dobrzensky of Dobrzenicz. Though his mother withheld dynastic consent, his parents attended his wedding. However, with the agreement of the Duke of Orléans, Head of the House of Orléans to which he belonged paternally, he and his descendants retained the right to use the title Prince/ss of Orléans-Braganza.

After the deaths of her maternal grandparents, Isabelle's parents moved from the Pavillon des Ministres on the castle grounds into the main Chateau. They spent the winter months in a townhouse in Boulogne-sur-Seine. In 1924, her father's cousin, Prince Adam Czartoryski, placed at the family's disposal, apartments in the palatial Hôtel Lambert on the Île Saint-Louis in Paris, where Isabelle and her siblings undertook their studies. The family travelled extensively and much of Isabelle's youth was spent visiting her maternal relatives at their large estate at Chotěboř, Czechoslovakia, Attersee, Austria, and Goluchow, Poland. With her father, Isabelle visited Naples, Constantinople, Rhodes, Smyrna, Lebanon, Syria, Cairo, Palestine and Jerusalem.

In 1920, Brazil lifted the law of banishment against its former dynasty and invited them to bring home the remains of Pedro II, although Isabelle's grandfather, the Count of Eu, died at sea during the voyage. But after annual visits over the next decade, her parents decided to repatriate their family to Petropolis permanently, where Isabelle attended day school at Notre-Dame-de-Sion while the family took up residence at the old imperial Grão Pará Palace. Until then, Isabelle was privately educated by governesses and tutors.

Marriage
Princess Isabelle first met her third cousin, Prince Henri of Orléans, heir to the Head of the House of Orléans, in 1920 at the home of the Duchess of Chartres, Henri's grandmother who was also a cousin of both of Isabelle's grandparents. In the summer of 1923, Henri was a guest at the Chateau d'Eu, at which time Isabelle, aged 12, resolved that she would one day marry him. However, he took no apparent notice of her at the wedding of his sister, Anne, to the Duke of Aosta at Naples in 1927. During a visit to his parents' home, the Manoir d'Anjou in Brussels, over Easter 1928, Henri began to show interest in Isabelle, and still more at a family reunion in July 1929.

Henri proposed to Isabelle on 10 August 1930 while taking part in a hunt at Count Dobržensky's Chotěboř home. The couple kept their engagement a secret until a family gathering at Attersee later that summer, but were obliged by the Duke of Guise to wait until Henri finished his studies at Louvain University before the betrothal was officially announced 28 December 1930.

On 8 April 1931, Isabelle and Henri were married at Palermo Cathedral; she was 19, and he was 22.  The wedding was held in Sicily, since the law of banishment against the heirs of France's former dynasties had not yet been abrogated. The two families selected Palermo because Isabelle's family owned a palace there, which had been the location of three earlier weddings. The wedding gave rise to several royalist demonstrations, and the road leading to the cathedral was lined with hundreds of visitors from France who viewed Henri as the rightful heir to the French throne. He was greeted with such cries as "Vive le roi, Vive la France" along with other monarchist cries and songs. These supporters were joined by  1,200 guests including members of the bride and groom's families, along with representatives of other royal dynasties.

Later life

Henri became pretender to the throne of France upon the death of his father, the Duke of Guise, in 1940. In 1947, Henri and Isabel's family took up residence at the Quinta do Anjinho, an estate in Sintra, on the Portuguese Riviera. In 1950, the law of banishment was repealed and the family moved to Paris.

Princess Isabelle, called Madame, and her husband used the French Royal coat of arms. She survived her late husband by four years.

Issue

Ancestry

Selected publications

References

Further reading

|-

1911 births
2003 deaths
House of Orléans-Braganza
Countesses of Paris
Princesses of France (Orléans)
People from Eu, Seine-Maritime
Burials at the Chapelle royale de Dreux